, also known in English as Fortunate Fawn, is a Japanese anime series from 1983. The series is based on Marjorie Kinnan Rawlings's 1938 novel of the same name. It has been produced in association with MGM/UA Entertainment Co. Television Distribution. Turner Entertainment Co. hold the rights to the series since 1986.

Despite the similar art style, this anime is unrelated to the World Masterpiece Theater series and is also based on the 1946 film by Metro-Goldwyn-Mayer.

The anime was not particularly successful during its original airing, and has faded into obscurity throughout the years. In Japan, it has never had any re-airings since the 1990s, nor has it ever been released on DVD or home video. The series has been released on DVD in the Netherlands, except for episode 33, whose Dutch dub masters were in bad condition, and episode 51, which was skipped in the dub.

References

External links 
 
 

Nippon Animation
1983 anime television series debuts